The Blue Peter Book Awards were a set of literary awards for children's books conferred by the BBC television programme Blue Peter. They were inaugurated in 2000 for books published in 1999 and 2000. The awards were managed by reading charity, Booktrust, from 2006 until the final award in 2022. From 2013 until the final award, there were two award categories: Best Story and Best Book with Facts.

The awards were discontinued in 2022, one month after the end of the Costa Book Awards, which included a category for children's book, leaving only two widely recognized awards for children's literature (the Kate Greenaway Medal and the Waterstones Children's Book Prize).

Categories
The Book of the Year dated from 2000 when there were also some "Voters' Awards" (2000 to 2002). Previously there were award categories for:
 Most Fun Story with Pictures, from 2007
 Best Illustrated Book to Read Aloud, 2004 to 2006
 Best Book with Facts, from 2003
 Best New Information Book, 2002
 Favourite Story, 2011
 Book I Couldn't Put Down, 2000 to 2010

Three books in each category were announced 4 December 2014 and considered by the panel of 200 children from 10 schools. The two winners for the 2015 awards were announced on 5 March 2015, or World Book Day (UK and Ireland).

Winners 
2022
 Best story: The Last Bear by Hannah Gold  
 Best Book with Facts: Invented by Animals by Christiane Dorian, illus. Gosia Herba
2021

 Best story: A Kind of Spark by Elle McNicoll
 Best Book with Facts: A Day in the Life of a Poo, A Gnu And You by Mike Barfield, illus. Jess Bradley

2020

 Best story: Wildspark by Vashti Hardy
 Best Book with Facts: Rise Up: Ordinary Kids with Extraordinary Stories by Amanda Li, illus. Amy Blackwell designed by Kim Hankinson and Jack Clucas

2019

 Best story: The Boy at the Back of the Class by Onjali Q. Rauf
 Best Book with Facts: The Colours of History by Clive Gifford, illus. Marc-Etienne Peintre

2018

 Best story: The Wizards of Once by Cressida Cowell
 Best Book with Facts: Real-Life Mysteries by Susan Martineau, illus. Vicky Barker

2017

 Best story: Podkin One Ear by Kieran Larwood, illus. David Wyatt
 Best Book with Facts: Survivors by David Long, illus. Kerry Hyndman

2016

 Best Story: The Nowhere Emporium by Ross MacKenzie
 Best Book with Facts: The Epic Book of Epicness by Adam Frost

2015

 Best Story: The Spy Who Loved School Dinners by Pamela Butchart, illus. Thomas Flintham (Nosy Crow)
 Best Book with Facts: The Silly Book of Side-Splitting Stuff by Andy Seed, illus. Scott Garrett (Bloomsbury)

2014

 Best Story: Rooftoppers by Katherine Rundell (Faber)
 Best Book with Facts: Tony Robinson's Weird World of Wonders: World War II by Tony Robinson, illus. Del Thorpe (Macmillan)

2013

 Best Story: Tom Gates: Genius Ideas (Mostly) by Liz Pichon (Scholastic)
 Best Book with Facts: House of Horrors (Horrible Science series) by Nick Arnold and Tony De Saulles (Scholastic)

2012

 Book of the Year: The Considine Curse by Gareth P. Jones (Bloomsbury)

2011

 Book of the Year: Dead Man's Cove (Laura Marlin Mysteries, 1) by Lauren St John (Orion)

2010

 Book of the Year: Frozen in Time by Ali Sparkes (Oxford)

2009

 Book of the Year: Shadow Forest by Matt Haig (Corgi)

2008

Prize didn't run.

2007

 Book of the Year: The Outlaw Varjak Paw by S. F. Said, illus. Dave McKean (David Fickling) – sequel to Varjak Paw (2003) 
 Most Fun Story With Pictures: You're a Bad Man, Mr Gum by Andy Stanton and David Tazzyman
 Best Book with Facts: The Worst Children's Jobs in History by Tony Robinson
 Book I Couldn't Put Down: The Outlaw Varjak Paw

2006

 Book of the Year: Lost and Found by Oliver Jeffers (HarperCollins)
 Best Illustrated Book to Read Aloud: Lost and Found
 Best Book with Facts: Spud Goes Green by Giles Thaxton (Egmont)
 Book I Couldn't Put Down: Blood Fever by Charlie Higson (Puffin)

2005

 Book of the Year: Private Peaceful by Michael Morpurgo (Collins)
 Best Illustrated Book to Read Aloud: The Snail and the Whale by Julia Donaldson, illus. Axel Scheffler (Macmillan)
 Best Book with Facts: Explorers Wanted! At the North Pole by Simon Chapman (Egmont)
 Book I Couldn't Put Down: Private Peaceful

2004

 Book of the Year: Man on the Moon by Simon Bartram (Templar)
 Best Illustrated Book to Read Aloud: Man on the Moon
 Best Book with Facts: The Ultimate Book Guide edited by Daniel Hahn, Leonie Flynn, and Susan Reuben (A & C Black)
 Book I Couldn't Put Down: Montmorency by Eleanor Updale (Scholastic)

2003

 Book of the Year: Mortal Engines by Philip Reeve (Scholastic)
 Best Book to Read Aloud:  Room on the Broom by Julia Donaldson, illus. Axel Scheffler (Macmillan)
 Best Book with Facts: Pirate Diary by Richard Platt, illus. Chris Riddell (Walker)
 Book I Couldn't Put Down: Mortal Engines

2002

 Book of the Year: Feather Boy by Nicky Singer (Collins)
 Best Book to Read Aloud: Crispin, the Pig Who Had It All by Ted Dewan (Random House)
 Best New Information Book: Ada Lovelace: The Computer Wizard of Victorian England by Lucy Lethbridge – about Ada Lovelace
 Book I Couldn't Put Down: Feather Boy
 Voter's Awards:
 Best Storybook: The Story of Tracy Beaker by Jacqueline Wilson (Yearling)
 Best Book With Facts In: Terrible Tudors (Horrible Histories series) by Terry Deary, illus. Martin Brown (Scholastic)

2001

 Book of the Year: The Wind Singer by William Nicholson (Egmont)
 Best Book to Read Aloud: The Bravest Ever Bear by Allan Ahlberg and Paul Howard (Walker)
 Book I Couldn't Put Down: The Wind Singer
 Best Book to Keep Forever: The Kite Rider by Geraldine McCaughrean (Oxford University Press)
 Voters' Awards:
 Best Storybook: Harry Potter and the Philosopher's Stone by J. K. Rowling (Bloomsbury)
 Best Book of Knowledge: Rotten Romans (Horrible Histories) by Terry Deary (Scholastic)

2000

 Book of the Year: A Pilgrim's Progress, retelling of The Pilgrim's Progress (1678) by Geraldine McCaughrean, illus. Jason Cockcroft (Hodder)
 Special Book to Keep Forever: A Pilgrim's Progress
 Book I Couldn't Put Down: Shadow of the Minotaur by Alan Gibbons (Orion)
 Best Book to Read Aloud: The Gruffalo by Julia Donaldson, illus. Axel Scheffler (Macmillan)
 Voters' Awards:
 Best Book With Facts in It: Guinness World Records (Guinness, 2000)
 Book that Made Me Laugh the Loudest: Matilda by Roald Dahl, illus. Quentin Blake (Puffin)
 Best Book to Share: Harry Potter and the Goblet of Fire by J. K. Rowling (Bloomsbury)

Shortlists

2020

 Best Book with Facts:
 Rise Up: Ordinary Kids with Extraordinary Stories by Amanda Li, illus. Amy Blackwell designed by Kim Hankinson and Jack Clucas (Buster Books)
 Fanatical About Frogs by Owen Davey (Flying Eye)
 How To Be An Astronaut and Other Space Jobs by Dr Sheila Kanani & Sol Linero (Nosy Crow)
 Best Story
 Wildspark by Vashti Hardy (Scholastic)
 Owen and the Soldier by Lisa Thompson, illus. Mike Lowery (Barrington Stoke)
 Vote for Effie by Laura Wood (Scholastic)

2019

 Best Book with Facts:
 The Colours of History by Clive Gifford, illus. Marc-Etienne Peintre (QED Publishing)
 Professor Astro Cat’s Human Body Odyssey by Dr Dominic Walliman, illus. Ben Newman (Flying Eye Books)
 The Element in the Room: Investigating the Atomic Ingredients that Make Up Your Home by Mike Barfield, illus. Lauren Humphrey (Laurence King)
 Best Story
 The Boy at the Back of the Class by Onjali Q Raúf (Orion Children's Books)
 The Clockwork Crow by Catherine Fisher (Firefly)
 The House With Chicken Legs by Sophie Anderson (Usborne)

2018

 Best Book with Facts:
 Real-Life Mysteries by Susan Martineau, illus. Vicky Barker (b small)
 Beyond the Sky: You and the Universe by Dara Ó Briain, illus. Dan Bramall (Scholastic)
 Corpse Talk: Ground-Breaking Scientists by Adam Murphy and Lisa Murphy (David Fickling Books)
 Best Story
 The Wizards of Once by Cressida Cowell (Hodder Children's Books)
 The Island at the End of Everything by Kiran Millwood Hargrave (Chicken House)
 Wed Wabbit by Lissa Evans (David Fickling Books)

2017
 Best Book with Facts:
 Destination: Space by Christoph Englert, illus. Tom Clohosy Cole (Wide Eyed Editions)
 Football School: Where Football Explains the World by Alex Bellos and Ben Lyttleton, illus. Spike Gerrell (Walker Books)
 Survivors by David Long (Faber and Faber)
 Best Story:
 Lost Tales by Adam Murphy (David Fickling Books)
 Podkin One Ear by Kieran Larwood, illus. David Wyatt (Faber and Faber)
 Time Travelling with a Hamster by Ross Welford (Harper Collins )

2016

 Best Book with Facts:
 The Epic Book of Epicness by Adam Frost
 The Silly Book of Weird and Wacky Words by Andy Seed, illus. by Scott Garrett
 FactFeed by Penny Arlon
 Best Story:
 The Astounding Broccoli Boy by Frank Cottrell-Boyce, illus. by Steven Lenton
 The Boy Who Sailed the Ocean in an Armchair by Lara Williamson
 The Nowhere Emporium by Ross MacKenzie

2015
 Best Book with Facts:
 Animalium by Jenny Broom, illus. Katie Scott (Big Picture Press)
 The Silly Book of Side-Splitting Stuff by Andy Seed, illus. Scott Garrett (Bloomsbury)
 Corpse Talk: Season 1 by Adam Murphy (David Fickling Books)
 Best Story
 The Boy in the Tower by Polly Ho-Yen (DoubleDay)
 Goth Girl and the Fete Worse Than Death by Chris Riddell (Walker)
 The Spy Who Loved School Dinners by Pamela Butchart, illus. Thomas Flintham (Nosy Crow)

2014

 Best Book with Facts:
 Marvellous Maths by Jonathan Litton, illus. Thomas Flintham (Templar Publishing)
 The World in Infographics: Animal Kingdom by Jon Richards illus. Ed Simkins (Wayland)
 Tony Robinson's Weird World of Wonders: World War II by Tony Robinson, illus. Del Thorpe (Macmillan)
 Favourite Story
 Whale Boy by Nicola Davies (Random House)
 Oliver and the Seawigs by Philip Reeve, illus. Sarah McIntyre (Oxford University Press)
 Rooftoppers by Katherine Rundell (Faber & Faber)

2013

 Best Book with Facts:
 House of Horrors (Horrible Science series) by Nick Arnold, illus. Tony De Saulles (Scholastic)
 Fantastic Mr Dahl by Michael Rosen (Puffin)
 Walter Tull's Scrapbook by Michaela Morgan (Frances Lincoln Children's Books) – about Walter Tull
 Favourite Story
 Tom Gates: Genius Ideas (Mostly) by Liz Pichon (Scholastic)
 Hero on a Bicycle by Shirley Hughes (Walker)
 The Boy Who Swam With Piranhas by David Almond, illus. Oliver Jeffers (Walker )

2012

 Best Book with Facts:
 The Official Countdown to the London 2012 Games by Simon Hart (Carlton Books)
 Discover the Extreme World by Camilla de la Bedoyere, Clive Gifford, John Farndon, Steve Parker, Stewart Ross and Philip Steele (Miles Kelly)
 Favourite Story
 The Considine Curse by Gareth P. Jones (Bloomsbury)
 A Year without Autumn by Liz Kessler (Orion Children's Books)

2011

 Most Fun Story with Pictures:
 Lunatics and Luck (Raven Mysteries, 3) by Marcus Sedgwick, illus. Pete Williamson (Orion Children's Books)
 Alienography by Chris Riddell (Macmillan)
 Mr Gum and the Cherry Tree by Andy Stanton, illus. David Tazzyman (Egmont)
 Best Book with Facts:
 Do Igloos Have Loos by Mitchell Symons (Doubleday)
 How the World Works by Christian Dorion, illus. Beverley Young, pop-ups designed by Andy Mansfield (Templar Publishing)
 What You Need To Know Now: The World in Facts, Stats, and Graphics by Joe Fullman, Ian Graham, Sally Regan and Isabel Thomas, illus. Sheila Collins, Mik Gates, Jim Green, Katie Knutton, Phillip Letsu and Hoa Luc (Dorling Kindersley)
 Favourite Story
 Dead Man's Cove (Laura Marlin Mystery, 1) by Lauren St John (Orion Children's Books)
 A Web of Air (Mortal Engines prequel) by Philip Reeve (Scholastic Children's Books)
 Tall Story by Candy Gourlay (David Fickling Books)

2010

 Most Fun Story with Pictures:
 Peter the Penguin Pioneer by Daren King (Quercus)
 Spells by Emily Gravett (Macmillan)
 Dinkin Dings and the Frightening Things by Guy Bass (Stripes)
 Best Book with Facts:
 Usborne Lift-the-flap Picture Atlas by Alex Frith and Kate Leake (Usborne)
 Tail-End Charlie by Mick Manning and Brita Granström (Frances Lincoln Children's Books)
 Why Eating Bogeys is Good for You by Mitchell Symons (Red Fox)
 Book I couldn't Put Down
 Cosmic by Frank Cottrell Boyce (Macmillan)
 The Boy Who Fell Down Exit 43 by Harriet Goodwin (Stripes)
 Frozen in Time by Ali Sparkes (Oxford)

2009

 Most Fun Story with Pictures:
 Mr Gum and the Dancing Bear by Andy Stanton and David Tazzyman (Egmont)
 Fleabag by Helen Stephens (Alison Green Books)
 Lost! The Hundred-Mile-An-Hour Dog by Jeremy Strong, illus. Rowan Clifford (Puffin Books)
 Best Book with Facts:
 Archaeology Detectives by Simon Adams (Oxford University Press)
 100 Most Dangerous Things on the Planet by Anna Claybourne (A & C Black)
 Planet in Peril (Horrible Geography series) by Anita Ganeri, illus. Mike Phillips (Scholastic)
 The Book I Couldn't Put Down:
 Abela by Berlie Doherty (Andersen Press)
 Shadow Forest by Matt Haig (Corgi)
 Foul Play by Tom Palmer (Puffin)

2008

Prize didn't run.

2007

 Most Fun Story with Pictures:
 Melrose and Croc Together at Christmas by Emma Chichester Clark
 Charlie Cook's Favourite Books by Julia Donaldson and Axel Scheffler
 You're a Bad Man, Mr Gum by Andy Stanton and David Tazzyman
 Best Book with Facts:
 Why is Snot Green? by Glenn Murphy
 The Worst Children's Jobs in History by Tony Robinson
 A Little Guide to Wild Flowers by Charlotte Voake
 The Book I Couldn't Put Down:
 Framed by Frank Cottrell Boyce
 The Bad Spy's Guide by Pete Johnson
 The Outlaw Varjak Paw by S. F. Said, illus. Dave McKean

2006

 Best Illustrated Book to Read Aloud:
 Traction Man is Here by Mini Grey
 Lost and Found by Oliver Jeffers (HarperCollins)
 Guess Who's Coming for Dinner by John Kelly and Cathy Tincknell
 Best Book with Facts:
 Connor's Eco Den by Pippa Goodhart
 Poo by Nicola Davies and Neal Layton
 Spud Goes Green by Giles Thaxton (Egmont)
 Book I Couldn't Put Down:
 GRK and the Pelotti Gang by Joshua Doder
 Blood Fever by Charlie Higson (Puffin)
 The Amazing Story of Adolphus Tips by Michael Morpurgo

2005

 Best Illustrated Book to Read Aloud:
 The Snail and the Whale by Julia Donaldson, illus. Axel Scheffler (Macmillan)
 Biscuit Bear by Mini Grey (Red Fox)
 Aristotle by Dick King-Smith, illus. Bob Graham (Walker)
 Rapunzel: A Groovy Fairy Tale, retelling of "Rapunzel" by Lynn Roberts, illus. David Roberts (Chrysalis)
 Best Book with Facts:
 Explorers Wanted! At the North Pole by Simon Chapman (Egmont)
 What's My Family Tree? by Mick Manning, illus. Brita Granström (Watts)
 Art Fraud Detective by Anna Nilsen, illus. Andy Parker (Kingfisher)
 Rome in spectacular cross-section by Andrew Solway, illus. Stephen Biesty (Oxford University Press)
 Book I Couldn't Put Down:
 Millions by Frank Cottrell Boyce (Macmillan)
 SilverFin by Charlie Higson (Puffin)
 Thora by Gillian Johnson (Hodder)
 Private Peaceful by Michael Morpurgo (Collins)

2004

 Best Illustrated Book to Read Aloud:
 The Woman Who Won Things by Allan Ahlberg, illus. Katharine McEwen (Walker Books)
 Man on the Moon by Simon Bartram (Templar)
 Quiet! by Paul Bright, illus. Guy Parker-Rees (Little Tiger Press)
 Atticus the Storyteller's 100 Greek Myths by Lucy Coats, illus. Anthony Lewis (Orion)
 The Smartest Giant in Town by Julia Donaldson, illus. Axel Scheffler (Macmillan)
 Best Book with Facts:
 Journey into the Arctic by Bryan and Cherry Alexander (OUP)
 Brilliant Brits: Shakespeare by Richard Brassey (Orion)
 Who is Emily Davison? by Claudia Fitzherbert (Short Books)
 The Ultimate Book Guide edited by Daniel Hahn (A & C Black)
 I Spy: Shapes in Art by Lucy Micklethwaite (Collins)
 Book I Couldn't Put Down:
 Stealing Stacey by Lynne Reid Banks (Collins)
 Fat Boy Swim by Catherine Forde (Egmont)
 The Garbage King by Elizabeth Laird (Macmillan)
 When Mum Threw Out the Telly by E. F. Smith (Orchard Books)
 Montmorency by Eleanor Updale (Scholastic)

See also

 Children's Laureate
 Carnegie Medal
 Guardian Prize
 Kate Greenaway Medal
 Nestlé Smarties Book Prize

References

External links
Blue Peter website 
 BBC  2007 Shortlists; 2006 Awards; 2005 Awards; 2004 Awards; 2004 Shortlists; 2003 Awards; 2002 Awards (all dead, 2015-04-15)

British children's literary awards
Blue Peter
BBC awards
Awards established in 2000
Awards disestablished in 2022
2000 establishments in the United Kingdom
2022 disestablishments in the United Kingdom